The Notothyladaceae is the only family of hornworts in the order Notothyladales.

In Guizhou Province, SW China, a new species named Notothylas guizhouensis is reported (ZHANG 2018). The species is easily distinguished from congeners by:  the lack of a columella, the dehiscence line consisting of two rows of brown, thick-walled cells, the absence of lamellae in the involucre, the epidermal cells of the capsule having a moderately thick wall, the lack of an easily recognisable equatorial girdle of the spore, and mature spores dark brown; the proximal (ZHANG 2018).

References

External links

Hornworts
Hornwort families